Van de Ven, Van der Ven and Vandeven are toponymic surnames of Dutch origin. The original bearer may have lived or worked near a ven, a Dutch term for a small lake, like fen ("veen" in Dutch) derived from the Proto-Germanic fanją. Van der Plas and Van der Poel are equivalent Dutch surnames. The name (in the form of van den Venne) can be found as early as the first part of the 14th century in Oirschot.  The name is quite common in the Netherlands, ranking 41st in 2007 (16,282 people). People with this surname include:

Andrew H. Van de Ven (born 1945), American business theorist
Cornelius Van de Ven (1865–1932), Dutch-born American Roman Catholic bishop
Hans van de Ven (born 1958), Dutch sinologist
Jan van de Ven (1925-2013), Dutch politician
Kirsten van de Ven (born 1985), Dutch footballer
Monique van de Ven (born 1952), Dutch actress and film director
Pauline van de Ven (born 1956), Dutch writer and artist
Peter van de Ven (born 1961), Dutch footballer
 (1931–2014), Dutch mathematician
Ton van de Ven (1944–2015), Dutch industrial designer

Van der Ven:
Dirk van der Ven (born 1970), Dutch footballer
 (1907–1988), Dutch jurist
Kees van der Ven (born ca. 1956), Dutch motorcycle racer
Remco van der Ven (born 1975), Dutch cyclist
Rick van der Ven (born 1991), Dutch archer

See also
Van de Venne
Van der Veen

References

Dutch-language surnames
Surnames of Dutch origin